Manley Burke is a legal professional association which publishes the Fraternal Law newsletter that deals with law related to North American fraternities and sororities.

Practice Areas
Manley Burke practices complex civil litigation in areas including fraternities and sororities, civil rights, zoning, eminent domain, education, and local government.

Anti-Hazing Hotline
Twenty-one North American fraternities and sororities have joined forces to establish a Greek Anti-Hazing Hotline. Students who believe they may be or become victims of hazing may call, anonymously if they choose, the hotline which is monitored by Manley Burke. Norval Stephens of the Delta Tau Delta Educational Foundation led the effort to establish the hotline.

Fraternal Law
Manley Burke publishes and distributes the Fraternal Law newsletter which covers subject areas including housing, alcohol abuse, hazing, and taxes.

Notes

External links
 Manley Burke

Law firms established in 1979
Law firms based in Cincinnati